Going Away is a 2013 French drama film directed by Nicole Garcia. It was screened in the Special Presentation section at the 2013 Toronto International Film Festival.

Cast
 Louise Bourgoin as Sandra 
 Pierre Rochefort as Baptiste Cambière 
 Dominique Sanda as Liliane Cambière 
 Déborah François as Emmanuelle Cambière 
 Éric Ruf as Gilles Cambière
 Benjamin Lavernhe as Thomas Cambière
 Mathias Brezot as Mathias 
 Olivier Loustau as Patrick
 Jean-Pierre Martins as Balou 
 Juliette Roux-Merveille as Lili 
 Michel Bompoil as Franck 
 Alexandre Charlet as Deuxième voyou

References

External links
 

2013 films
2013 drama films
French drama films
2010s French-language films
Films directed by Nicole Garcia
2010s French films